The Art Institute of Chicago contains a Book of the Dead scroll, an Ancient Egyptian papyrus depicting funerary spells. This scroll of funerary spells serves as a protection from "Second Death". In ancient Egyptian spiritual practice, the term "Second Death" refers to the phenomenon of the body permanently separating from the soul. The Book of the Dead scroll is made of papyrus, a material made of reed plants cultivated on marshy plantations, which is then cut into strips and left to dry in horizontal and vertical rows. The scroll also contains pigments used to inscribe the funerary spells.

Mythology 

In Ancient Egyptian spirituality, one can only completely achieve sanctity when confronted with death itself, meaning that the physical body is only one place where a person exists. Destruction of a person's body after death leads to an incomplete passing into the afterlife. Existence itself continues in the afterlife, experiences such as sexual and material pleasure do not stop after death. The Book of the Dead scroll was a culturally common item that is used as a guide into the afterlife. The Book of the Dead was a privately owned item, the spells only gained significance through the use of imagery throughout the text. These scrolls are often also referred to as The Spell(s) for Coming Forth By Day. In order for a person's soul to be continued after death, there are many rituals the community must perform. When performing spells from the Book of the Dead, there is much importance placed on vocalization. The "opening of the mouth ceremony" shows the emphasis placed on the dead being able to talk, ensuring their arrival into the afterlife as well maintain the ability to eat and drink. Osiris is the God of the dead and ruler of the underworld. He is shown with green skin representing fertility, resurrection and rebirth in the afterlife. The importance of one's body being in complete form after death is a reference to Osiris's myth. In his myth, he is cut up into pieces but lives on in the realm of the dead, called the Duat. Osiris is often illustrated in Book of the Dead scrolls because of his direct connection to death and his significance in guiding one into the afterlife. The Book of the Dead is supposed to guide people through the physical landscapes of the Duat. Oftentimes during ones passing into the afterlife, it is hoped that a man or woman may become an Osiris, meaning they have the opportunity to be admitted into an afterlife of higher value such as becoming a spirit alongside Osiris.

Biography 
The scroll belonging to the Art Institute of Chicago was found in the tomb of a woman named Taywhenwtmut. The scroll is illustrated very beautifully, suggesting this woman may have been of higher status. The scroll was commissioned to illustrate the God Osiris. This scroll's function has changed since its creation creating the biography. It first served as a guide into the afterlife for Taywhenwtmut, it then functioned as a commodity when sold by the archaeologist. Presently it functions as a contribution to the broaden the education of the general public's knowledge on Ancient Egyptian culture and specifically funerary practices at The Art Institute of Chicago.

Donation 
The artifact was donated to The Art Institute of Chicago by Henry H. Getty, Charles Hutchinson, Robert H. Flemming, and Norman W. Harris in 1894. These donors have also contributed many other Ancient Egyptian works to the Art Institute of Chicago. Some of which are as follows: Statuette of Imhotep, Egyptian Ptolemaic Period (332-30 B.C.) Bronze h. 11.7 cm (4 5/8 in.), Amulet of the God Horus as a Falcon, Late Period - Ptolemaic Period, (664-30 B.C.) Faience, 6.9 x 2.8 x 6.8 cm (2 3/4 x 1 1/8 x 2 5/8 in.) Ointment Vessel with Lid, New Kingdom, Dynasty 18 (c. 1570–1293 B.C.) Egyptian alabaster and steatite, Vessel: 12.3 x 11.4 x 11.4 cm (4 7/8 x 4 1/2 x 4 1/2 in.); lid: 0.7 x 6.7 x 6.7 cm (5/16 x 2 5/8 x 2 5/8 in.) Around the time of this scroll's donation in 1894, large contributions were made by a few of the men seen as creators of the "advent" of Egyptian artifacts in the Midwest through Anthropological and Archaeological work. John D. Rockefeller, his son John D. Rockefeller Jr., William Rainey Harper, and James Henry Breasted made large contributions to the Egyptian Collections of The Oriental Institute of Chicago in 1890.

Display 
The Art Institute of Chicago was founded in 1879. The Art Institute of Chicago collects and preserves items of universal cultural and artistic value in support of public interest and education of the fine arts. The curation of the scroll presented at The Art Institute of Chicago explains that the scroll originated from the 21st Egyptian Dynasty, 1070-946 BC also known as the Third Intermediate Period. The scroll was part of the exhibit; When the Greeks Ruled Egypt. This exhibit was on view through July 27, 2014. The objects of this exhibit are either part of The Art Institute's permanent collection, loans from the University of Chicago, loans from the Oriental Institute, or private loans. This scroll is part of the permanent collection.

See also 
Osiris
Book of the Dead
Art Institute of Chicago
Oriental Institute of Chicago
Third Intermediate Period of Egypt

References

Further reading 

Egyptian papyri containing images